The lists shown below shows the Australia men's national soccer team all-time record against opposing nations. The statistics are composed of FIFA World Cup, FIFA Confederations Cup,  OFC Nations Cup, AFC Asian Cup and Summer Olympics matches, as well as numerous international friendly tournaments and matches.

Head-to-head record

Only "A" internationals are included. Although there is some conjecture regarding the status of a number of games, the table includes all fixtures recognised by Football Australia as "A" internationals and as such is used to recognise caps, goal scorers, captaincy records, etc. Last match updated on 3 December 2022 vs. .

Notes:
 1 includes 
 2 includes 
 3 includes 
 4 includes 
 5 includes 
 6 includes 
 7 includes  &

Performances

Performance by competition
For performances by major tournaments refer to Competitive record

Best Results
The following table shows Australia's best results against opposition by confederation, Only "A" internationals are included.

UEFA 

Notes:
 1 includes Czechoslovakia
 2 includes West Germany
 3 includes Macedonia
 4 includes Soviet Union
 5 includes Yugoslavia

CONMEBOL

CONCACAF

CAF 

Notes:
 1 includes Southern Rhodesia and Rhodesia

AFC 

Notes:
 1 includes South Vietnam

OFC

Penalty shoot-out record

References

Australia national soccer team records and statistics
National association football team all-time records